Shegaon  is a city and municipal council in the Buldhana district in the Indian state of Maharashtra. Shegaon has become a pilgrimage centre due to the influence of Shri Sant Gajanan Maharaj, who is considered a saint by Hindus.

Demographics

 India census, Shegaon had a population of 52,418. Men constitute 52% of the population and women, 48%. Shegaon has an average literacy rate of 73%, which is higher than the national average of 59.5%: male literacy is 78%, and female literacy is 66%. In Shegaon, 14% of the population is under 6 years of age.

Transportation
It is connected by Hajira–Dhule–Howrah National Highway 6 to Khamgaon, Balapur, Malkapur and Akola.

Shegaon Railway station is located on the Howrah–Nagpur–Mumbai line of the Central Railway of Indian Railways. It has direct train connectivity to Mumbai CST, Lokmanya Tilak Terminus Mumbai, Delhi, Chennai, Secunderabad, Pune, Akola, Tatanagar, Ahmedabad, Okha, Kolhapur, Amravati, Wardha, Nanded, Nagpur, Gondia, Bilaspur, Howrah Station, Shalimar Station, Chandrapur railway station, and Chennai Central.
Several Mumbai trains stop at Shegaon, including the Gitanjali Express, Vidarbha Express, Amravati Superfast Express, Mumbai–Howrah Mail and Express, Sewagram Express, Nagpur–Pune Express, Navjivan Express, Gondwana Express, Maharashtra Express, Okha–Puri Express, and Ltt–Shalimar Express.

For long distance superfast trains, Akola Junction is located at a distance of 45.7 kms.

Education

All colleges in Shegaon are affiliated with Sant Gadge Baba Amravati University. These include, but are not limited to, the Industrial Training Institute and the Shri Sant Gajanan Maharaj College of Engineering (SSGMCE). There are also institutions run by the Gajanan Maharaj Sansthan, including: Shri Sant Gajanan Maharaj English Medium School, Shri Sant Gajanan Maharaj Warkari Shikshan Sanstha, Shri Sant Gajanan Maharaj Adiwasi Ashram School, Shri Sant Gajanan Maharaj Mentally Retarded School, Mauli College of Engineering, Siddhivinayak Technical Campus, and Saraswati College.

Industry 
Shegaon has traditionally had a large cotton market, with the product from ginning and pressing mills of Shegaon transported to textile mills in Mumbai via goods trains. British textile companies like Rallis India had their procurement office in Shegoan during pre-independence days. Many ginning and pressing mills like M. M. Ginning & Pressing Factory, Bhattad Group of Ginning & Mills, Gajanan Ginning Factory and Oil Mill, Bhartia Group of Ginning and Mills operate in this area.

Shegaon also has engineering industries that manufacture material-handling equipment like chain pulley blocks, industrial cranes, and link chains. Shegaon has a mineral water bottling plant, oil mills, paint manufacturing, and other industries.

Demographics 
As per Indian census of 2011, the population of Shegaon was 59672.

Climate 

More than 86% of average annual rainfall comes in the monsoon season from June to September.

Landmarks

Shri Sant Gajanan Maharaj Temple
Shri Sant Gajanan Maharaj Temple is named for Gajanan Maharaj who once lived there. Hindus consider Gajanan Maharaj a saint with miraculous powers, and the temple is built at his place of samādhi (meditation). It is the largest temple trust in the Vidarbha region and is known as the "Pandharpur of Vidarbha". It attracts pilgrims from across Maharashtra.

A trust coordinates the day-to-day affairs of the temple. It is headed by the managing trustees, who traditionally come from the Patil family. The trust coordinates services in the spiritual, religious, medical, and educational fields.

Anand Sagar
Shegaon has a tourist attraction called "Anand Sagar". The project's budget is  crore (3 billion rupees). There is a  statue of Swami Vivekananda above a meditation cell at the centre of the water reservoir. It is a replica of Vivekananda Kendra at Kanyakumari. There is an Amphitheatre which seats 3,500 people, used to organize cultural activities, functions, and exhibitions. The water reservoir being developed is anticipated to meet existing and proposed needs of the Sansthan.

Shegaon Tehsil
Shegaon Tehsil is part of the Buldhana district.

Some of the villages are: Janori,Kalkhed, Jalamb, Pahurjira, Bhota, Sagoda, Bhongaon, Dadgaon, Matargaon, Mongaon Digras, Taroda Tarodi, Pahurpurna, Manasgaon, Adsul, Zadegaon, Palodi, Shrikshetra Nagzari, Chincholi Karfarma, Gaigaon, Jawala Palaskhed, Wankhed, Jawala, Alasana, Kherda, Gaulkhed, Takali Viro, Lasura, Warkhed, Amboda, Lanjud, Pimpri Deshmukh, Tintrav, Gavhan, and Taroda Kasaba.

References

External links

 Shegaon, Anand Sagar and Anand Vihar description with many photographs
  The temple of Sant Gajanan Maharaj of Shegaon promoted by Yogiraj Gajanan Seva Pratisthan, Nagpur
 Shri Sant Gajanan Maharaj College of Engineering
 Siddhivinayak Technical Campus, Shegaon

Cities and towns in Buldhana district
Talukas in Maharashtra